Connor Davies (born 17 January 1997) is a Welsh professional rugby league footballer who plays as a  for the Dewsbury Rams in the Championship and Wales  at international level.

Playing career

Club career
Born in Swansea, Wales, Davies started his professional career at South Wales Scorpions in 2015. He moved to England to join Halifax, initially playing for the reserve team before making his first team debut in 2018. The club announced that Davies would be leaving Halifax at the end of the 2021 season.

After a brief spell with French club Villeneuve Leopards, Davies joined Workington Town in April 2022. In July 2022, he was signed by Dewsbury Rams following his release by Workington Town.

International career
He was selected in the Wales 9s squad for the 2019 Rugby League World Cup 9s.

Davies was named in the Wales squad for the 2021 Rugby League World Cup.

Personal life
His twin brother Curtis Davies is also a professional rugby league player.

References

External links
Halifax profile
Wales profile
Welsh profile

1997 births
Living people
Welsh rugby league players
Rugby league players from Swansea
Rugby league hookers
Halifax R.L.F.C. players
Villeneuve Leopards players
Workington Town players
Dewsbury Rams players
Wales national rugby league team players